CD38 (cluster of differentiation 38), also known as cyclic ADP ribose hydrolase is a  glycoprotein found on the surface of many immune cells (white blood cells), including CD4+, CD8+, B lymphocytes and natural killer cells. CD38 also functions in cell adhesion, signal transduction and calcium signaling.

In humans, the CD38 protein is encoded by the CD38 gene which is located on chromosome 4.  CD38 is a paralog of CD157, which is also located on chromosome 4 (4p15) in humans.

History 
CD38 was first identified in 1980 as a surface marker (cluster of differentiation) of thymus cell lymphocytes. In 1992 it was additionally described as a surface marker on B cells, monocytes, and natural killer cells (NK cells). About the same time, CD38 was discovered to be not simply a marker of cell types, but an activator of B cells and T cells. In 1992 the enzymatic activity of CD38 was discovered, having the capacity to synthesize the calcium-releasing second messengers cyclic ADP-ribose (cADPR) and nicotinic acid adenine dinucleotide phosphate (NAADP).

Tissue distribution 

CD38 is most frequently found on plasma B cells, followed by natural killer cells, followed by B cells and T cells, and then followed by a variety of cell types.

Function 

CD38 can function either as a receptor or as an enzyme. As a receptor, CD38 can attach to CD31 on the surface of T cells, thereby activating those cells to produce a variety of cytokines.CD38 activation cooperates with TRPM2 channels to initiate physiological responses such as cell volume regulation.

CD38 is a multifunctional enzyme that catalyzes the synthesis of ADP ribose (ADPR) (97%) and cyclic ADP-ribose (cADPR) (3%) from NAD+.  CD38 is thought to be a major regulator of NAD+ levels, its NADase activity is much higher than its function as an ADP-rybosyl-cyclase: for every 100 molecules of NAD+ converted to ADP ribose it generates one molecule of cADPR. When nicotinic acid is present under acidic conditions, CD38 can hydrolyze nicotinamide adenine dinucleotide phosphate (NADP+) to NAADP.

These reaction products are essential for the regulation of intracellular Ca2+. CD38 occurs not only as an ectoenzyme on cell outer surfaces, but also occurs on the inner surface of cell membranes, facing the cytosol performing the same enzymatic functions.

CD38 is believed to control or influence neurotransmitter release in the brain by producing cADPR. CD38 within the brain enables release of the affiliative neuropeptide oxytocin.

Like CD38, CD157 is a member of the ADP-ribosyl cyclase family of enzymes that catalyze the formation of cADPR from NAD+, although CD157 is a much weaker catalyst than CD38. The SARM1 enzyme also catalyzes the formation of cADPR from NAD+, but SARM1 elevates cADPR much more efficiently than CD38.

Clinical significance 

The loss of CD38 function is associated with impaired immune responses, metabolic disturbances, and behavioral modifications including social amnesia possibly related to autism.

CD31 on endothelial cells binds to the CD38 receptor on natural killer cells for those cells to attach to the endothelium. CD38 on  leukocytes attaching to CD16 on endothelial cells allows for leukocyte binding to blood vessel walls, and the passage of leukocytes through blood vessel walls.

The cytokine interferon gamma and the Gram negative bacterial cell wall component lipopolysaccharide induce CD38 expression on macrophages. Interferon gamma strongly induces CD38 expression on monocytes. The cytokine tumor necrosis factor strongly induces CD38 on airway smooth muscle cells inducing cADPR-mediated Ca2+, thereby increasing dysfunctional contractility resulting in asthma.

The CD38 protein is a marker of cell activation. It has been connected to HIV infection, leukemias, myelomas, solid tumors, type II diabetes mellitus and bone metabolism, as well as some genetically determined conditions.

CD38 increases airway contractility hyperresponsiveness, is increased in the lungs of asthmatic patients, and amplifies the inflammatory response of airway smooth muscle of those patients.

Increased expression of CD38 is an unfavourable diagnostic marker in chronic lymphocytic leukemia and is associated with increased disease progression.

CD38 is upregulated on plasmacytoid dendritic cells (pDCs) in vivo during human influenza infection and blocking CD38 prevents the ability of pDCs to produce type I interferon in vitro.

Clinical application 
CD38 inhibitors may be used as therapeutics for the treatment of asthma.

CD38 has been used as a prognostic marker in leukemia.

Daratumumab (Darzalex) which targets CD38 has been used in treating multiple myeloma.

The use of Daratumumab can interfere with pre-blood transfusion tests, as CD38 is weakly expressed on the surface of erythrocytes. Thus, a screening assay for irregular antibodies against red blood cell antigens or a direct immunoglobulin test can produce false-positive results. This can be sidelined by either pretreatment of the erythrocytes with dithiothreitol (DTT) or by using an anti-CD38 antibody neutralizing agent, e.g. DaraEx.

Inhibitors
 Cassic acid (Rhein) 
 CD38-IN-78c
 Chrysanthemin (Kuromanin) 
 compound 1ai 
 compound 1am 
 Daratumumab
 Isatuximab
 Felzartamab (MOR202)
 apigenin
 Luteolinidin
 MK-0159
 TNB-738

Aging studies 
A gradual increase in CD38 has been implicated in the decline of NAD+ with age. Treatment of old mice with a specific CD38 inhibitor, 78c, prevents age-related NAD+ decline. CD38 knockout mice have twice the levels of NAD+ and are resistant to age-associated NAD+ decline, with dramatically increased NAD+ levels in major organs (liver, muscle, brain, and heart). On the other hand, mice overexpressing CD38 exhibit reduced NAD+ and mitochondrial dysfunction.

Macrophages are believed to be primarily responsible for the age-related increase in CD38 expression and NAD+ decline. Cellular senescence of macrophages increases CD38 expression. Macrophages accumulate in visceral fat and other tissues with age, leading to chronic inflammation. The inflammatory transcription factor NF-κB and CD38 are mutually activating. Secretions from senescent cells induce high levels of expression of CD38 on macrophages, which becomes the major cause of NAD+ depletion with age.

Decline of NAD+ in the brain with age may be due to increased CD38 on astrocytes and microglia, leading to neuroinflammation and neurodegeneration.

References

Further reading

External links 
 
 
 GeneCard CD38 
 

Clusters of differentiation